Francis Ronald Egerton, 7th Duke of Sutherland (born 18 February 1940), known as Francis Ronald Egerton until 2000, is a British peer from the Egerton family.

Family
Sutherland is the son of Cyril Reginald Egerton, the grandson of Francis Egerton, 3rd Earl of Ellesmere. His mother was Mary, daughter of Sir Ronald Campbell. Sutherland was educated at Eton and Royal Agricultural College, Cirencester (Gloucestershire).

Career
On 21 July 2000, Sutherland succeeded his first cousin once-removed as 7th Duke of Sutherland and 6th Earl of Ellesmere. Most of Sutherland's wealth is in the form of the art collection put together by the first Duke's uncle, Francis Egerton, 3rd Duke of Bridgewater, which had been inherited by the Ellesmere line of the family. In 2008 he sold Titian's Diana and Actaeon to the National Gallery of Scotland and National Gallery in London for £50 million.

He ranked 107th in the Sunday Times Rich List 2009, with an estimated wealth of £480m in art and land, including Mertoun House and Stetchworth House. In the 2020 edition of the list, his net worth was estimated to be £585 million.

Marriage and issue
Sutherland married Victoria Mary Williams, born in Newbury on 21 June 1946, daughter of Major-General Edward Alexander Wilmot Williams and wife Sybilla Margaret Archdale, in Winterborne Monkton, Dorset, on 11 May 1974. They have two sons:
 James Granville Egerton, Marquess of Stafford (born Cambridge, Cambridgeshire, 12 August 1975), who is married to Barbara Ruth Schneider. They have four daughters: 
 Lady Isabelle Victoria Egerton (born 10 December 2007)
 Lady Louise Anna Egerton (born 7 January 2010)
 Lady Violet Mary Egerton (born 11 November 2011)
 Lady Charlotte Mabel Ellesmere Egerton (born 26 March 2015)
 Lord Henry Alexander Egerton (born 28 February 1977), who is married to Harriet Carter. They have three daughters: 
 Beatrice Georgina Egerton (born 7 June 2005)
 Fenella Sybilla Egerton (born 18 January 2008)
 Rose Evelyn Egerton (born 20 March 2011)

Arms

References

 "Burke's Peerage and Baronetage"
 "Who's Who in Austria 1961"
 "Fluchtpunkt England", Reinhard Müller, 1996
 http://familytreemaker.genealogy.com/users/s/t/u/Harry-M-Stuart/PDFGENEO5.pdf

External links
 Francis Egerton, 7th Duke of Sutherland

Sutherland, Francis Ronald Egerton, 7th Duke of
Sutherland, Francis Ronald Egerton, 7th Duke of
Dukes of Sutherland
Sutherland, Francis Ronald Egerton, 7th Duke of
Sutherland, Francis Ronald Egerton, 7th Duke of
Francis
Francis
British billionaires